Khaled Al-Rashidi (born 20 April 1987) is a Kuwaiti goalkeeper who is currently playing for Qadsia.

Al-Rashidi began his senior career with Al Tadamon in 2005, having progressed through the club's youth ranks, before switching to Tatran Prešov in 2008. Unable to break into the first team, and having only made ten league appearances, he switched to Al Salibikhaet in 2010, but made just two league appearances before moving once more to Al Arabi that year. After 104 league appearances as the first team in 2 and a half seasons, he won the Kuwait Crown Prince Cup and Kuwait Super Cup and had 1 goal vs Kuwait SC, he moved to England in 2013 when he joined Nottingham Forest from Kuwaiti club Al-Arabi.

Career

Career in Kuwait
He scored a goal in a Kuwaiti Premier League for Al Arabi against Al Kuwait.

Nottingham Forest

In July 2012, Al-Rashidi joined  Nottingham Forest on a month-long trial. Nottingham Forest put in a work permit application for Al-Rashidi along with two other Kuwait players but they were all turned down on August 23, 2012.

On 16 January 2013 it was announced by Nottingham Forest chairman Fawaz Al-Hasawi that a second work permit application had been successful and that Al-Rashidi had signed for the club. He was named as a substitute against Birmingham City on 2 February 2013.

On 15 January 2014 Al-Rashidi left Nottingham Forest.

Personal life
Khalid older brother, Fahad, was another footballer and also played for Al-Tadhamon, Al-Arabi and Al-Salmiya.

Honours

Al-Arabi 

Kuwait Crown Prince Cup:1
2011–12 

Kuwait Super Cup:1
2012

Al-Salmiya 

Kuwait Crown Prince Cup:1
2015–16

Individual
2015–16 VPL Golden Glove

References

External links
 Tatran Presov
 

1984 births
Living people
Kuwaiti footballers
Kuwaiti expatriate footballers
Association football goalkeepers
1. FC Tatran Prešov players
Slovak Super Liga players
Expatriate footballers in Slovakia
Kuwaiti expatriate sportspeople in Slovakia
2011 AFC Asian Cup players
2015 AFC Asian Cup players
Kuwait international footballers
Nottingham Forest F.C. players
Expatriate footballers in England
Kuwaiti expatriate sportspeople in England
Footballers at the 2006 Asian Games
Al-Sulaibikhat SC players
Al Salmiya SC players
Asian Games competitors for Kuwait
Kuwait Premier League players
Qadsia SC players
Al-Arabi SC (Kuwait) players
Al Tadhamon SC players